Helen Kelesi (born 15 November 1969) is a former professional tennis player from Canada. She was coached by her father Milan Kelesi.

Career
"Hurricane Helen", as the Canadian press dubbed her for her fiery demeanour, achieved a career-high ranking of world No. 13 (November 1989), and was a regular fixture in the top 25 from 1986 to 1991. She won singles titles at two tour events, the 1986 Japan Open and the 1988 Citta de Taranto, and at the French Open, she was a quarterfinalist in 1988 (losing to Gabriela Sabatini) and 1989 (losing to Mary-Joe Fernandez). During her time on the WTA Tour, Kelesi recorded wins over Arantxa Sánchez Vicario, Conchita Martinez, Jana Novotná, Manuela Maleeva-Fragnière, Helena Suková and Pam Shriver.

Kelesi's game was characterized by aggressive baseline play, with a powerful top-spin forehand and two-handed backhand. She also retrieved well and could play defensively when needed. These skills meant that Kelesi was particularly good on clay and hardcourt surfaces.

Kelesi was a Canadian Federation Cup team member from 1986 to 1993. She was Tennis Canada Singles Player of the Year four times (1986, 1987, 1989, and 1990).

Her professional career came to an end in 1995 when a brain tumour the size of a tennis ball was discovered following months of headaches, dizziness and vision problems. Numerous operations followed over the years. Kelesi successfully recovered and began coaching young children in Canada in the late 1990s. She also became a part-time tennis journalist and commentator.

WTA career finals

Singles: 9 (2 titles, 7 runner-ups)

Doubles: 5 (2 titles, 3 runner-ups)

ITF finals

Singles (3–0)

Doubles (0–2)

Grand Slam singles performance timeline

External links
 
 
 

1969 births
Living people
Canadian female tennis players
Sportspeople from Victoria, British Columbia
Racket sportspeople from British Columbia
Tennis players at the 1988 Summer Olympics
Olympic tennis players of Canada
20th-century Canadian women